22B3 is the only studio album by the American pop rock band Device, which was released in 1986.

Track listing

Personnel
 Paul Engemann – vocals
 Holly Knight – bass, keyboards, drum programming, vocals
 Gene Black – acoustic and electric guitars

Production
Produced by Mike Chapman
Recorded by Mike Chapman, with assistance by Brian Scheuble
Mixed by George Tukto
Tracks 1-9 published by The Makiki Pub. Co. Ltd./Arista Music Inc.
Track 10 published by The Makiki Pub. Co. Ltd./Knighty Knight Music/Arista Music Inc.

Charts 

Singles

References

Device (pop rock band) albums
1986 debut albums
Chrysalis Records albums
Albums produced by Mike Chapman